Sehnaj Singh (born 29 July 1993) is an Indian professional footballer who plays as a midfielder for NorthEast United in the Indian Super League.

Club career

Pailan Arrows
Sehnaj is a product of the Gurdaspur Football Academy and the Chandigarh Football Academy. During the summer of 2011, he signed for Pailan Arrows who were then known as Indian Arrows, to play in the I-League. He played his first game for the team against East Bengal on 18 December 2011. He then continued in the starting line-up for the Arrows against Pune in a match that ended 1–1.

Mumbai Tigers and Mumbai FC
Sehnaj joined Mumbai in January 2014 from Mumbai Tigers after the club was disbanded. Sehnaj was initially part of the Mumbai Tigers' squad to take part in the 2013 I-League 2nd Division. He made his debut for Mumbai on 15 January 2014 in the Federation Cup at the Jawaharlal Nehru Stadium, Kochi in which he played the first half before being replaced by Henry Ezeh as Mumbai lost the match 1–0.

Mohun Bagan
On 20 June 2014 Sehnaj signed for Mohun Bagan. He was a regular for Bagan during the 2014–15 season, appearing 18 times in the centre of midfield as a regular and helping his side be crowned the champions.

Delhi Dynamos
In July 2015, Sehnaj was drafted to play for Delhi Dynamos for the 2015 Indian Super League. He scored his first goal of the ISL against Kerala Blasters to make the score 3–3 from over 30 yards in the final league game of the Dynamos' season

NorthEast United
On 6 September 2021, Sehnaj joined NorthEast United on a two-year deal. In 2021–22 season he made ten appearance for NorthEast United.

International
Sehnaj started his international career at the under-19 level with India U19 against Turkmenistan U19's on 31 October 2011 in the AFC U19 Cup qualifiers.

Sehnaj was called up for the 2018 World Cup group stage games group games against Oman and Guam by Stephen Constantine. He made his national team debut on 11 June 2015 against Oman in a Group D game of the 2018 World Cup qualifier in a 1–2 loss at home in Bengaluru's Sree Kanteerava Stadium. During the second leg of the World Cup qualifier against Guam, India played the second half with 10 men after Sehnaj Singh was sent off for a dangerous tackle in the 41st minute.

Career statistics

Club

Honours

Club
Mohun Bagan
I-League (1): 2014-15

ATK
Indian Super League (1): 2019–20

Notes

References

External links 
 Profile at Goal.com

Indian footballers
1993 births
Living people
Footballers from Chandigarh
I-League players
Indian Arrows players
Mumbai Tigers FC players
Mumbai FC players
Mohun Bagan AC players
Odisha FC players
Mumbai City FC players
East Bengal Club players
NorthEast United FC players
Indian Super League players
India youth international footballers
Association football midfielders
ATK (football club) players